Səhləbad is a village and municipality in the Tartar District of Azerbaijan.  It has a population of 2,075.

References 

Populated places in Tartar District